Alonso Alberto Granados Lozano (born October 6, 1986 in Cancún, Quintana Roo) is a Mexican former professional footballer, who last played as a striker for Toluca in the Primera Division de Mexico. He made his debut February 8, 2009 against Puebla F.C. A game which resulted in a 2–0 victory for Toluca.

References

External links
 
 

1986 births
Living people
Liga MX players
Deportivo Toluca F.C. players
People from Cancún
Atlético Mexiquense footballers
Footballers from Quintana Roo
Mexican footballers
Association football forwards